Tarkeo Corner is an unincorporated community in Decatur County, Indiana, in the United States.

History
The post office Tarkeo Corner once contained was named Tarkeo. It opened in 1871, and was discontinued in 1881.

References

Unincorporated communities in Decatur County, Indiana
Unincorporated communities in Indiana